is a Japanese manga series written and illustrated by Sanko Takada. It was serialized in Shogakukan's seinen manga magazine Monthly Big Comic Spirits from December 2010 to November 2013.

Media

Manga
Written and illustrated by Sanko Takada, Taberu Dake was serialized in Shogakukan's seinen manga magazine Monthly Big Comic Spirits from December 27, 2010, to November 27, 2013. Shogakukan collected its chapters in four tankōbon volumes, released from November 30, 2011, to January 30, 2014.

Volume list

Drama
A twelve-episode television drama adaptation, starring Mariko Gotō as the unnamed protagonist known as Shizuru, was broadcast on TV Tokyo from July 13 to September 28, 2013.  performed the series' opening theme , while Mariko Gotō performed the ending theme "Sound of Me".

Notes

References

External links
 
 

Cooking in anime and manga
Seinen manga
Shogakukan manga
Supernatural anime and manga
TV Tokyo original programming